Gonzalez is a census-designated place (CDP) in Escambia County, Florida. As of the 2010 United States Census, the population was 13,273. Gonzalez is a suburban community located north of Pensacola, and south of Cantonment. Tate High School, the largest public school in Escambia County, is located in Gonzalez.

History
The village of Gonzalez has also been called Gonzalia, named after the Gonzalez family who owned a farm in the area. Manuel Gonzalez, the patriarch of the family, was originally from Spain. He had arrived in the New World sometime around 1790. He served as an Indian Agent under Francisco Bouligny in New Orleans, before eventually arriving in Pensacola.

During the American Civil War, Gonzalez was home to a Confederate storage facility run by Manuel Gonzalez’s son, Samuel Z. Gonzalez. The Gonzalez farm was also the location of a military skirmish between Union forces headquartered out of Fort Barrancas and Confederate troops.

Geography
Gonzalez is located at  (30.574386, -87.290031).

Demographics

According to the 2020 United States census, the population of Gonzalez was 14,586 with 5,436 households. There were 2.64 persons per household. The population was 963.3 per square mile. 

5.4% of the population were under 5 years old, 23.2% were under 18 years old, and 16.7% were 65 years or over. 55.0% were female. 

79.3% were white, 10.7% were black or African American, 3.7% were Asian, 0.1% were Native Hawaiian and other Pacific Islander, 4.2% were two or more races, and 7.2% were Hispanic or Latino. There were 1,242 veterans living in the CDP and 4.8% were foreign born persons. 

94.5% of the households had a computer and 93.8% had a broadband internet subscription. 94.2% had a highschool or comparable degree. 31.9% had a Bachelor’s degree or higher. Median household income was $76,314 with a per capita income of $35,061. 4.0% of the population lived below the poverty threshold.

References

Pensacola metropolitan area
Census-designated places in Escambia County, Florida
Census-designated places in Florida